Jon Whitcomb (1906–1988) was an American illustrator. He was well known for his pictures of glamorous young women. He was born in Weatherford, Oklahoma and grew up in Manitowoc, Wisconsin. He attended Ohio Wesleyan University and graduated from Ohio State University with a major in English. He is the brother of fashion designer and inventor Merry Hull.

Whitcomb started drawing illustrations for student publications while a student at Ohio State, and worked summers painting posters for a theater in Cleveland, Ohio. After he graduated, Jon found work making travel and theater posters and advertising illustrations. In 1934, he moved to New York City and joined with Al Cooper to found the Cooper Studio. Whitcomb was a pioneer in the switch from oil to gouache for illustrations. The different qualities of gouache compared to oil led to changes in the design of Whitcomb's illustrations. He zoomed in on people, usually pretty, young city women, and reduced the background to simple design elements. His new style of illustrations soon appeared in Collier's Weekly, Good Housekeeping and other magazines.

During World War II, Whitcomb was commissioned a Lieutenant, Junior Grade in the United States Navy. After a variety of duties, he was assigned as a combat artist for the invasions of Tinian, Saipan, and Peleliu.

After the war, Whitcomb produced a series of articles and sketches about Hollywood stars for Cosmopolitan, called "On Location with Jon Whitcomb". He continued to produce story illustrations and covers for magazines, including McCall's and Playboy. He wrote some short stories, two children's books, Coco, and Pom Pom's Christmas, and a book on glamour, All About Girls. He was one of the founding faculty of the Famous Artists School.

References

Jon Whitcomb biography - retrieved August 3, 2006
American Art Archives - Jon Whitcomb - retrieved August 3, 2006
 - retrieved via Wayback Machine 28 October 2011
Jon Whitcomb posters, hosted by the University of North Texas Libraries Digital Collections

External links
The Ohio State University Billy Ireland Cartoon Library & Museum: Jon Whitcomb Collection guide

1906 births
1988 deaths
People from Weatherford, Oklahoma
People from Manitowoc, Wisconsin
Ohio Wesleyan University alumni
Ohio State University College of Arts and Sciences alumni
American illustrators
United States Navy personnel of World War II
United States Navy officers
Military personnel from Wisconsin